The XT-97 assault rifle (5.56公釐XT97突擊步槍) is a 5.56mm assault rifle developed by the 205th Armory, Ministry of National Defense in Taiwan. It was first displayed in public during the 2009 Taipei Aerospace & Defense Technology Exhibition.

Design
The weapon is designed in Taiwan. The design departs significantly from the T65 assault rifle lineage with the bolt being based on the AK design. The stock is both retractable and foldable. Any optical scope/sight can be placed on the picatinny rails.

Intended users of the XT97 rifle include infantry, airborne, marines, artillery, and mechanized/motorized vehicle crew.

No figures have been released on volume production.

Variants

XT105
The XT105 is a refined version of the XT97 released in 2015, the first unit off of the production line was gold plated. It features interchangeable 300mm, 360mm, and 450mm barrels. The upper receiver is made from a single piece of extruded aluminum and the lower receiver is made of polymer. The stock features holes which can hold the rifle’s takedown pins during field stripping.

XT107
The XT107 is a refined version of the XT105 released in 2017.

See also
Howa Type 20

References

External links
 

Weapons and ammunition introduced in 2009
5.56×45mm NATO assault rifles
Firearms articles needing expert attention
Firearms of the Republic of China